Michael John Arlen (born December 9, 1930, London, England) is an American writer, primarily of non-fiction and personal history, as well as a longtime staff writer and television critic for The New Yorker.

Early life

Arlen is the son of a British-Armenian writer, Michael Arlen, and former Countess Atalanta Mercati of Athens, Greece. His early childhood was spent with his family in Cannes, in the South of France. At the outbreak of World War II, he was at boarding school in England and went with his school to join a Canadian school in Ottawa, Canada. Later he transferred to St. Paul's School, Concord, NH, after which he went to Harvard College, where he was a co-President of The Harvard Lampoon and graduated in 1952.

Career

Arlen worked as a reporter on Life for five years, from 1952 to 1957, before joining the staff of The New Yorker in 1957 where he remained until 1990. His first book was Living-Room War, a collection of his television pieces centered on the Vietnam War. The book's title, a term Arlen coined, has gone on to be heavily referenced in academic and journalistic writing. His two best-known books are Exiles (focused on his childhood in the South of France) and Passage to Ararat (about his Armenian heritage),  both of them personal histories that first appeared in full in The New Yorker.

Awards

Exiles was short-listed for the National Book Award. Passage to Ararat won the National Book Award (Contemporary Affairs) in 1976.

Personal life

Arlen has four children from his first marriage. He married a second time, to screenwriter Alice Albright, in 1972, and together they raised an extended family of seven children. Alice Albright Arlen died in 2016.

Works
Living-Room War (1969)
An American Verdict (1974)
Exiles (1970)
Passage to Ararat (1975) — National Book Award, Contemporary Affairs
The View from Highway 1 (1976)
Thirty Seconds (1980)
The Camera Age (1981)
Say Goodbye to Sam (1984)
The Huntress (2016)

References

External links
 Michael J. Arlen at Library of Congress Authorities — with 20 catalog records

American television critics
The New Yorker staff writers
Life (magazine) photojournalists
War writers
20th-century American journalists
20th-century American memoirists
American people of Armenian descent
National Book Award winners
The Harvard Lampoon alumni
Harvard College alumni
Writers from London
English emigrants to the United States
British people of Armenian descent
English people of Armenian descent
English people of American descent
1930 births
Living people